Dennis Gerald Littlejohn (October 4, 1954), is a former Major League Baseball player who played catcher from  to . He would play for the San Francisco Giants. Littlejohn attended the University of Southern California.

External links

1954 births
Major League Baseball catchers
Baseball players from California
San Francisco Giants players
Living people
USC Trojans baseball players
Alaska Goldpanners of Fairbanks players
Denver Bears players
Fresno Giants players
Phoenix Giants players
Waterbury Giants players